The 2019 UCI Women's World Tour was a competition that included twenty-three road cycling events throughout the 2019 women's cycling season. It was the fourth edition of the ranking system launched by the Union Cycliste Internationale (UCI) in 2016. The competition began with the Strade Bianche on 9 March and concluded with the Tour of Guangxi on 22 October.

After just missing out in 2018, Marianne Vos clinched her first UCI Women's World Tour title after a third-place finish in the final event of the season, the Tour of Guangxi. Vos, who finished with 1592 points, took three overall victories during the season at Trofeo Alfredo Binda-Comune di Cittiglio, La Course by Le Tour de France and the Ladies Tour of Norway and podiumed at three further events. 2018 winner Annemiek van Vleuten of the  team led the standings for the majority of the season, but was surpassed by Vos at the final event; van Vleuten's tally of 1467.67 points included a trio of victories at Strade Bianche, Liège–Bastogne–Liège and the Giro Rosa and three second-place finishes in the month of April. The top-three overall was completed by the season's best young rider, 's Lorena Wiebes on 1302.33 points. Wiebes took two overall victories during the season; she was the benefactor of Kirsten Wild's disqualification from victory at the Prudential RideLondon Classique, while at the Tour of Chongming Island, Wiebes won all three stages, as well as the general, points and young rider classifications. From the 22 individual events, a total of 12 riders won races while the World Tour lead changed five times between van Vleuten, Vos and Marta Bastianelli.

With 46 points, Wiebes was the winner of the youth classification for riders under the age of 23. Wiebes took seven victories during the season including three consecutive races at the Prudential RideLondon Classique, the Postnord UCI WWT Vårgårda West Sweden race and the Ladies Tour of Norway. Second place went to  rider Marta Cavalli with 42 points, who won four races during the 2019 season. In the World Tour's other classification, the teams classification,  made it four consecutive titles with a total of 4045 points; three of their riders – Anna van der Breggen (three wins), Amy Pieters and Christine Majerus (one win) – all finished inside the top-ten of the individual standings. They finished well clear of second-place  on 2946 points – who failed to take an overall victory – and the new-for-2019  team, who took three victories, finished third with 2547.98 points.

Teams

Events
For the 2019 season, the calendar consisted of 23 races, down from 24 in 2018.

Points standings
For the 2019 season, the point-scoring system introduced by the Union Cycliste Internationale (UCI) in 2018, rewarding the top 40 riders remained in place.

Individual
Riders tied with the same number of points were classified by number of victories, then number of second places, third places, and so on, in World Tour events and stages.

Youth
The top three riders in the final results of each World Tour event's young rider classification received points towards the standings. Six points were awarded to first place, four points to second place and two points to third place.

Team
Team rankings were calculated by adding the ranking points of all the riders of a team in the table.

Notes

References

External links

 
2019 in women's road cycling
UCI Women's World Tour